Kambu may refer to:

Kambu Swayambhuva, the ancient Indian sage
The Tamil name of pearl millet
Kambu, an ethnic group in Nigeria, see e.g. List of languages in Nigeria
Kambu, a place in Kibwezi Constituency, Kenya

Places in Iran
 Kambu, Hormozgan